This is a list of gliders/sailplanes of the world, (this reference lists all gliders with references, where available) 
Note: Any aircraft can glide for a short time, but gliders are designed to glide for longer.

Romanian miscellaneous constructors

Post-WWII aircraft factories 
 CIL - (Complexu Industrializare Lemnului - Reghin)
 URMV-3 - (Uzinele de Reparatii Material Volant-3 – Braşov)
 ICA-Braşov - (Intreprinderea de Construcţii Aeronautice - Braşov)
 IFIL - (Intreprinderea Forestierǎ di Industrializare a Lemnului)
 IIL - (Intreprinderea de industrie Locală- Ghimbav)
 IAR - (Industria Aeronautică Română)

Gliders 
 August 1909 glider – (Henry August)
 Popiou GEP
 Manicatide RM-10
 ICAR 1 – Primary
 Kasprzyk Salamandra
 Popa OP-1 – (Ovidiu Popa)
 Popa OP-22 – (Ovidiu Popa)
 A Vlaicu glider
 Costǎchescu CT-2 COSTĂCHESCU, Traian
 Giuncu-Popa GP-2 GIUNCU, Octavian & POPA, Ovidiu, manufacturer Atelierele de Reparaţii Material Volant - ARMV-2, Pipera, Bucarest
 CIL Reghin Albatros – Vladimir Novitchi
 IFIL-Reghin RG-4 Pionier – Vladimir Novitchi
 IFIL-Reghin RG-5 Pescarus – Vladimir Novitchi
 URMV-3 IS-2 – Iosif Șilimon
 URMV-3 IS-3 – Iosif Șilimon
 IIL IS-4 – Iosif Șilimon
 IIL IS-5 – Iosif Șilimon
 IIL IS-7 – Iosif Șilimon
 IIL IS-8 – Iosif Șilimon
 IIL IS-10 – Iosif Șilimon
 IIL IS-11 – Iosif Șilimon
 IIL IS-12 – Iosif Șilimon
 ICA IS-28 – Iosif Șilimon
 ICA IS-29 – Iosif Șilimon
 ICA IS-32 – Iosif Șilimon
 ICA IAR-35

Notes

Further reading

External links

Lists of glider aircraft